Halifax Regional Fire and Emergency Services provides fire protection, rescue and first responder assistance throughout Halifax, Nova Scotia, Canada.

History 

Halifax originated as a British fortification in 1749, followed by Dartmouth in 1750 and Sackville in 1751.  The Halifax Fire Service is the oldest fire department in Canada (1754). It was first known as the Union Fire Club and then became the Union Engine Company (1768).  The Dartmouth Fire Department was eventually formed on the east side of the harbour in 1861.

Nine fire fighters were killed in the Halifax Explosion, the most ever at a single event in Canada.

In 1996, with the creation of the newly amalgamated Halifax Regional Municipality, the Fire Service was consolidated through a merger of the fire departments of the cities of Halifax and Dartmouth, the town of Bedford and the many volunteer departments located throughout Halifax County.  At that time, there were 515 career fire fighters and 1,200 volunteer firefighters from a total of 38 fire departments would become part of the new organization.  This extremely diverse entity was brought together under Fire Chief Gary Greene and Deputy Chiefs Michael Eddy and William Mosher.

The department is currently led by Fire Chief Ken Stuebing, Deputies Peter Andrews, Dave Meldrum, Roy Hollett and Corey Beals.

In 2011, a museum to commemorate the history of fire fighting in Nova Scotia, with special attention to the Halifax region was opened in Fall River, Nova Scotia named the Regional Firefighters Interpretation Centre. Their website is www.rficns.com 
There is a provincial firefighter museum in Yarmouth. Since 2012, there is an Annual Firefighter Memorial Service on June 2.

The Fallen Firefighters monument is located at Station 4, 5830 Duffus Street, Halifax.

Operations
The service consists of a total of 51 stations, 489 career firefighters and civilian employees, over 600 volunteer firefighters, and is divided into 2 primary divisions:

 "Core" - Serving HRM's urban core, this division comprises 18 twenty-four hour stations, 10 all career stations, and 8 composite stations with additional volunteer staff.  Communities and neighbourhoods are covered by this division in Halifax, Dartmouth, Bedford, Eastern Passage, Westphal, Cole Harbour and Lower Sackville.  
 "Rural" - Serving HRM's large rural area in the eastern and western parts of Halifax County, this division is primarily volunteer, supported by composite day staff stations.  It comprises 30 fire departments with 33 stations (24 all volunteer, 9 composite), 95 trucks, 500 volunteer and 38 career firefighters organized into 4 zones.

In addition to regular urban and rural firefighting services, HRFE also provides Technical Rescue, Water and Ice Rescue, Hazardous Materials, and Medical First Responder services.  Under the currently suspended Federal USAR Task Force program, HRFE had been designated as CAN TF-5, one of 5 HUSAR teams from across Canada.  HRFE is also equipped and trained for CBRN response.

Statistics 

489 career firefighters 
Approx. 600 volunteer firefighters
Approx. 13,000 emergency calls per year
51 stations

Apparatus
41 Engines
37 Tankers
21 Light Rescues
 5 Quints
 2 Aerials
 6 Tactical Support units
 1 Heavy Rescue
 1 HazMat Decon unit
 7 Brush trucks
 1 Command unit
 1 Rehab unit
 1 Harbour Rescue Boat
 8 Lake Rescue Boats
 Various Utility trucks and support vehicles

Station closures

In 2013 Halifax Regional Fire & Emergency Services approved the closure of Fire Stations 32 (Mooseland), 37 (Elderbank), 53 (Terrence Bay), 61 (Ketch Harbor) and 51 (Upper Hammonds Plains). These stations were Sub Stations of other Fire Stations in the area. As well, Station 62 (Harrietsfield) suffered a fire in Jan 2015 that closed the station permanently. These areas are still protected fully by HRM Fire.

A new Station 62 is currently being constructed in Williamswood to replace Stations 62 and 63, and is scheduled to open November 2020. As well the process to relocate Stations 8 (Bedford) and 9 (Lower Sackville) to centralize them in areas of rapid growth is underway.

References 
Allison Lawlor. 250 Years Of Progress: Halifax Regional Fire & Emergency Service.  Nimbus Publishing. 2005

External links
 
 Halifax Professional Firefighters Association

Government in Halifax, Nova Scotia
Fire departments in Nova Scotia
1754 establishments in North America
1996 establishments in Canada